Hassan Ahmed Hamad is an Egyptian athlete who was a member of the Egyptian Athletics team between 1978 and 1992.

He was a member of one of the strongest Egyptian teams in throw events with Nagui Asaad, Hisham Greiss and Mohamed Naguib Hamed, this team is considered to be the strongest team Egypt ever had by many Egyptian sport experts.

Achievements

Twice African champion in Discus throw, 1989, 1990. 
Silver medallist  African championship in Discus throw, 1988. 
Silver medallist in Discus throw of the 1979 Mediterranean Games
Bronze medallist  African championship in Discus throw, 1985. 
Bronze medallist in Discus throw of the 1987 Mediterranean Games
Twice Bronze  medallist in Discus throw  of the All Africa Games, 1987, Nairobi, 1991, Cairo

See also
List of champions of Africa of athletics
Egyptian athletes
All-Africa Games
African Championships in Athletics
List of Egyptians

References

External links
 African Athletic Champions gbrathletics website http://www.gbrathletics.com/ic/afc.htm 
Mediterranean Games Athletic results  gbrathletics website http://www.gbrathletics.com/ic/mg.htm
All Africa Games Athletics results gbrathletics website http://www.gbrathletics.com/ic/afg.htm

Year of birth missing (living people)
Living people
Egyptian male discus throwers
African Games bronze medalists for Egypt
African Games medalists in athletics (track and field)
Mediterranean Games silver medalists for Egypt
Mediterranean Games medalists in athletics
Athletes (track and field) at the 1987 All-Africa Games
Athletes (track and field) at the 1979 Mediterranean Games
Athletes (track and field) at the 1987 Mediterranean Games